Joseph or Joe Cole may refer to:
 Joe Cole (actor) (born 1988), English actor
 Joe Cole (born 1981), English footballer
 Joe Robert Cole, American film and television director, writer, and producer
 Joseph Cole (cinematographer), film cinematographer and producer
 Joseph Foxcroft Cole (1837–1892), American landscape artist
 Joseph S. Cole (1831–1916), educator in South Australia
 Joseph E. Cole (1914–1995), American businessman
 Joseph Dennis Cole (1961–1991), roadie for Black Flag and Rollins Band, see Murder of Joe Cole
 Joseph Cole, Malta, see List of Ambassadors and High Commissioners to the United Kingdom